Khmu  is the language of the Khmu people of the northern Laos region. It is also spoken in adjacent areas of Vietnam, Thailand and China.  Khmu lends its name to the Khmuic branch of the Austroasiatic language family, the latter of which also includes Khmer and Vietnamese.  Within Austroasiatic, Khmu is often cited as being most closely related to the Palaungic and Khasic languages.  The name "Khmu" can also be seen romanized as Kmhmu, Khmu', Kammu, or Khamuk in various publications or alternatively referred to by the name of a local dialect.

Dialects
 Khmu has several dialects but no standard variety.  Dialects differ primarily in consonant inventory, existence of register, and the degree to which the language has been influenced by the surrounding national language(s).  Dialects are, for the most part, mutually intelligible; however communication can be difficult between speakers of geographically distant dialects.

The dialects of Khmu can be broadly categorized into two groups, Western Khmu and Eastern Khmu.

Western Khmu dialects have fewer consonant phonemes and instead use phonemic register contrast, as seen in other Austroasiatic languages, of "lax" breathy register and "tense" modal register.  In at least one dialect of Western Khmu, known as Khmu Rook, tonogenesis is evident as the register contrast has developed into a system of two phonetic tones with six phonemic realizations.
Eastern Khmu dialects show the opposite tendency. Completely lacking either register or tone distinction, these dialects utilize a three-way distinction of stops (voiced, voiceless and aspirated voiceless) and nasals (voiced, voiceless, and pre-glottalized) in the syllable-initial position for phonemic contrast.

Suwilai Premsrirat (2002)
Suwilai Premsrirat (2002) reports the following locations and dialects of Kmhmu' in Laos, Vietnam, China, and Thailand.

Laos: spoken in the 8 northern provinces of Luang Namtha, Udomsai, Bokeo, Sayaburi, Phongsali, Luang Prabang, and Xiaq kvaaq, with a few villages near Vientiane. Dialects include Kmhmu' Rook, Khmu Lw,  and Kmhmu' Cwaq (also known as Kmhmu' Uu).
Vietnam: Kim Hua, Sop Pot, Sop Caw and Pung Kamong Villages, Kim Da Subdistrict, Tương Dương District, Vinh City, Nghệ An Province. Also in Lai Châu Province, Sơn La Province, and Thanh Hóa Province.
China: Pung Soa village (more conservative with voicing contrasts in the initial consonants) and Om Kae village (has tonal contrasts) in Sipsongpanna, Yunnan
Thailand: many villages, including the representative datapoint of Huai Ian village, Lai Ngao subdistrict, Wiang Kaen district, Chiang Rai province (originally from Pak Bang district of Laos, where the language is called Khmu Khrong, meaning 'Mekong Khmu'). Also in Nan province and Lampang province.

Phonology

Consonants
The consonant inventory of Khmu' is shown in the table below.  The phonemes in the colored cells are particular to the dialects of Eastern Khmu. The phoneme /f/, present in dialects of both Eastern and Western Khmu', is a result of borrowings from the surrounding Tai languages.

Vowels
The vowels of the Khmu' language show little variation across the dialects with all varieties having 19 monophthongs and three diphthongs (and ).

Grammar

Pronouns

Syntax 
Khmu uses mainly an SVO word order although an OVS order is also possible.

Vocabulary

Numeral

Comparison with Khmer

See also
Khmuic languages
Khmu people
List of Khmu plant common names
List of Khmu animal common names

References

Thomas Khammeung Manokoune (Tamong)

Further reading

 Prēmsīrat, Suwilai. The Thesaurus and Dictionary Series of Khmu Dialects in Southeast Asia. Nakorn Pathom: Institute of Language and Culture for Rural Development, Mahidol University at Salaya, Thailand, 2002. 
 Prēmsīrat, Suwilai. Khmu, a Minority Language of Thailand. Papers in South-East Asian linguistics, no. 10. Canberra, A.C.T., Australia: Dept. of Linguistics, Research School of Pacific Studies, Australian National University, 1987. 
 Proschan, Frank. Kmhmu' Language and Language Policy: At Home and Abroad. s.l: s.n, 1995.
 Proschan, Frank. Poetic Parallelism in Kmhmu Verbal Arts: From Texts to Performances. s.l: s.n, 1988.
 Smalley, William Allen. Outline of Khmu structure. American Oriental series. Essay, v.2. New Haven, Conn: American Oriental Society, 1961.
 Svantesson, Jan-Olof. Kammu Phonology and Morphology. Travaux de l'Institut de linguistique de Lund, 18. Lund: CWK Gleerup, 1983.

External links 

 http://projekt.ht.lu.se/rwaai RWAAI (Repository and Workspace for Austroasiatic Intangible Heritage)
 http://hdl.handle.net/10050/00-0000-0000-0003-66EA-B@view Khmu in RWAAI Digital Archive
Database of audio recordings in Khmu - basic Catholic prayers

Languages of Laos